Al-Ahly Shendi Club is a football (soccer) club from Sudan based in Shendi.

They finished fourth in the 2011 Sudan Premier League. They created big history for the city for the club, for the city of Shendi and for Sudan by progressing to any African competition for the first time and made a record by been drawn with the other Sudanese clubs in the same group and no other country in CAF competitions has represented three

Honours

National titles
Sudan Cup
Winner (1): 2017

Performance in CAF competitions

CAF Confederation Cup: 9 appearances

2012 – group stage (Top 8)
2013 – second round
2014 – first round
2015 – first round
2016 – second round
2017 – first round 
2018 - first round
2018–19 - preliminary round 
2019–20 - preliminary round

Performance in CECAFA competitions
CECAFA Clubs Cup \ Kagame Interclub Cup: 2 appearances'''
2013 – Quarter-finals
2015 – Quarter-finals

Players

Out on loan

 (loan) Al-Nedal SC (Al-Nehoud) (Until June 2023)

External links
 Club profile – footballdatabase.com

 
Football clubs in Sudan
1943 establishments in Sudan